Asuridia carnipicta is a moth of the family Erebidae first described by Arthur Gardiner Butler in 1877. It is found in China.

References

Nudariina
Moths of Japan
Moths described in 1877